Bailando por un Sueño 2008 was the fifth Argentinean season of Bailando por un Sueño.

The first show of the season aired on April 14, 2008 as part of the original show, Showmatch, broadcast on Canal 13 and hosted by Marcelo Tinelli. This time, there were 40 couples competing, and the competition lasted 35 weeks. The winner was revealed on the season finale, on December 11, 2008:  the model Carolina "Pampita" Ardohaín, who was paired with the professional dancer Nicolás Armengol. This season was the first to include among the participants international celebrities such as Gabriela Bo (from Paraguay), Ilona "Cicciolina" Staller (from Italy), María Eugenia "Kenita" Larraín (from Chile) and Serafín Zubiri (from Spain).

The panel of judges had a change: Graciela Alfano left her place, and Carmen Barbieri entered to replace her. The other judges from the previous season stayed on:  journalist Jorge Lafauci, comedian Moria Casán and Gerardo Sofovich.

Couples 

 Ilona "Cicciolina" Staller left the competition, and Adabel Guerrero entered in her place.
 Evangelina Anderson left the competition, and Eliana Guercio entered in her place.
 Eliana Guercio left the competition, and Claudia Fernández entered in her place.
 Lucas González was the original partner, but he left the competition after Hip-Hop's round.
Winners of the re-entry (round 23):
Matías Alé & Gisela Bernal (replacing Carolina Baldini & Pablo Pedernera).
Adabel Guerrero & Joel Ledesma.
Pablo Ruiz & Vanessa Encina.
Marixa Balli (replacing Sabrina Rojas) & Juan Pablo Battaglia.
María Fernanda Callejón & Rodrigo Escobar.
Natalia Fassi & Abel Faccini.
Mariana de Melo (replacing Verónica Varano) & Jorge Tajomisski.

Scoring chart 

 indicate the lowest score for each week.
 indicate the highest score for each week.
 indicates the couple eliminated that week.
 indicates the couple was saved by the public.
 indicates the couple was saved by the jury.
 indicates the couple withdrew.
 indicates the winning couple.
 indicates the runner-up couple.
 indicates the semi-finalists couples.
 Laura Fidalgo, Sofía Zámolo and María Fernanda Callejón were sentenced because they stopped their routines in the middle of the choreography, as they forgot it, but they were all saved by the judges (Laura in round 19, Sofía in round 21 and María Fernanda in round 27).
 In round 33, all the couples danced Cha-cha-cha as they were in a sentence, so there were no scores. Two couples were saved by the judges, two by the public vote, and two were eliminated.
replaced by Anabel Cherubito.
replaced by Ximena Capristo.
replaced by Claudia Fernández.
replaced by Belén Tellez.
replaced by Jéssica Almada.
replaced by Cecilia Oviedo.
replaced by Marixa Balli.
replaced by Celina Rucci.
replaced by Cecilia Oviedo.

Highest and lowest scoring performances 
The best and worst performances in each dance according to the judges' marks are as follows:

Styles, scores and songs
Secret vote is in bold text.

April

From April 22 to 28 Gerardo Sofovich was replaced by actor and comedian Antonio Gasalla, who scored the remaining couples in the competition.

May

June

July

August

September

Re-entry

October

November

December

Duel

Semi-final and Final

References

External links
  Canal 13's Showmatch website

Argentina
Argentine variety television shows
2008 Argentine television seasons